Graywood is a community in the Canadian province of Nova Scotia, located in Annapolis County. It is on Nova Scotia Trunk 8 at an elevation of approximately 180m.

References

Communities in Annapolis County, Nova Scotia